Thomas Schöning (born probably in Riga – 11 August 1539 in Kokenhusen) was Archbishop of Riga.  He was a member of a prominent Riga burgher family and son of Johann Schöning.  He studied at the University of Rostock between 1499 and 1500. Schöning was notable for the dating of coins. During his reign from 1528 to 1539, mark, shilling, and pfenning coins from Riga bore the family shield of Thomas Schöning.

With the growing strength of the Reformation centered in Livonia, his position was difficult. Schöning moved his residency to the archbishop's palace at Kokenhusen in 1528 because of the conflict with the city of Riga and the Order of Livonia. He found unusual support in Duke Albert of Prussia, who was part of the Protestant movement. Duke Albrecht recommended Schöning appoint the duke's brother, Wilhelm von Brandenburg, as his coadjutor (assistant) and eventual successor. His body was buried in the parish church of Kokenhusen.

Eventually, the Archbishopric of Riga and the Livonian Order were dissolved in 1561 after the conversion of the territory from Catholicism to Lutheranism at the beginning of Swedish rule.

References

Sources 
 

1539 deaths
Prince-bishops in Livonia
Archbishops of Riga
Year of birth unknown